Rubén Peña Jiménez (born 18 July 1991) is a Spanish professional footballer who plays for CA Osasuna as either a right-back or right winger.

He made over 140 La Liga appearances for Valladolid, Eibar and Villarreal, winning the Europa League with the last of those clubs in 2021.

Club career

Early career
Born in Ávila, Castile and León, Peña made his senior debut with local club Real Ávila CF in Tercera División. In the summer of 2012 he signed for Real Valladolid, being initially assigned to the reserves in the same level.  

Peña appeared in his first official game with the first team on 1 November 2012, playing the full 90 minutes in a 1–0 home win against Real Betis in the round of 32 of the Copa del Rey (3–1 aggregate loss). He made his La Liga debut ten days later, coming on as a late substitute in a 1–1 home draw with Valencia CF.

On 13 August 2013, Peña joined CD Guijuelo of Segunda División B. On 10 July of the following year he moved to CD Leganés, newly promoted to the Segunda División.

Eibar
On 16 June 2016, after being an important figure in Lega's first-ever promotion to the top flight, Peña signed a three-year deal with SD Eibar in the same league. He finished his first season with 28 appearances and one goal, helping to a tenth-place finish.

Peña was converted into a right-back by manager José Luis Mendilibar during 2017–18. He became a regular starter in that position the following campaign, after the departure of Ander Capa.

Villarreal
On 4 July 2019, Peña joined Villarreal CF on a five-year contract. He made his competitive debut on 17 August, starting and scoring an own goal in a 4–4 home draw against Granada CF. His first goal in the correct net came on 2 February 2020 in a 3–1 victory over CA Osasuna also at the Estadio de la Cerámica.

Peña struggled for game time after the signing of Juan Foyth in 2020, and was an unused substitute as the team won the 2021 UEFA Europa League Final against Manchester United. He was put up for sale, and was due to be loaned to Deportivo Alavés at the start of 2022, but it was called off when he injured his collarbone in a cup game at Atlético Sanluqueño CF.

Osasuna
On 17 June 2022, with Foyth, Mario Gaspar and Serge Aurier ahead of him at right-back, Peña reached an agreement to terminate his Villarreal contract three years early. On the same day, he signed for Osasuna until 2025.

Career statistics

Club

Honours
Villarreal
UEFA Europa League: 2020–21

References

External links

1991 births
Living people
People from Ávila, Spain
Sportspeople from the Province of Ávila
Spanish footballers
Footballers from Castile and León
Association football defenders
Association football wingers
La Liga players
Segunda División players
Segunda División B players
Tercera División players
Real Ávila CF players
Real Valladolid Promesas players
Real Valladolid players
CD Guijuelo footballers
CD Leganés players
SD Eibar footballers
Villarreal CF players
CA Osasuna players
UEFA Europa League winning players